Pubudu Seneviratne (born 9 January 1980) is a Sri Lankan former cricketer. He played in 53 first-class and 47 List A matches between 1999/00 and 2009/10. He made his Twenty20 debut on 17 August 2004, for Sebastianites Cricket and Athletic Club in the 2004 SLC Twenty20 Tournament. He was a past pupil of Dharmaraja College.

References

External links
 

1980 births
Living people
Sri Lankan cricketers
Badureliya Sports Club cricketers
Burgher Recreation Club cricketers
Colombo Cricket Club cricketers
Sebastianites Cricket and Athletic Club cricketers
Place of birth missing (living people)
Alumni of Dharmaraja College